James Joseph Barrett (17 December 1879 – 27 July 1942) was an Irish track and field athlete who represented Great Britain at the 1908 Summer Olympics. He was born in Rahela, Ballyduff, County Kerry, Ireland and worked as a Royal Irish Constabulary officer. He was the brother of Edward Barrett.

In 1908 he participated in the Greek discus throw event and in the shot put competition but in both contests his result is unknown.

References

External links
 

1879 births
1942 deaths
Irish male discus throwers
Irish male shot putters
British male discus throwers
British male shot putters
Olympic athletes of Great Britain
Athletes (track and field) at the 1908 Summer Olympics
Sportspeople from County Kerry
Royal Irish Constabulary officers